Dr. Christian Lodewyk Stals, better known as Chris Stals (born 13 March 1934) was the seventh Governor of the South African Reserve Bank, serving from 8 August 1989 to 7 August 1999.  He succeeded Dr. Gerhard de Kock who had died in office.

He obtained a BComm degree from the University of Pretoria

During his term, South Africa's constitutional arrangements were changed again.  The Second Republic was superseded by the Third Republic.  It was also during his term that South Africa returned to the Commonwealth of Nations.  It was President Nelson Mandela who kept Dr. Stals in office.  Stals was succeeded by Tito Mboweni.

References

External links
Reserve Bank profile 

1934 births
Living people
Afrikaner people
Governors of the South African Reserve Bank
20th-century South African businesspeople
20th-century South African economists
South African people of Dutch descent
University of Pretoria alumni